The Miami Marlins are a Major League Baseball (MLB) franchise based in the U.S. state of Florida. The Marlins became members of MLB as an expansion team in the 1993 season. Through 2017, they have played 3,981 games, winning 1,870 and losing 2,111 for a winning percentage of .470. This list documents the superlative records and accomplishments of team members during their tenures as Marlins in MLB's National League East.

Giancarlo Stanton holds the most franchise records as of the end of the 2018 season, with ten records, including both the most career and single-season home runs, RBI, slugging percentage, and total bases records.

No Marlin holds a Major League or National League record for any of the below statistics. However, the Marlins are tied with the Los Angeles Angels of Anaheim and the Houston Astros for the shortest franchise record losing streak, recording 11 straight losses twice in 1998 and once in June 2011.

Individual career records
Batting statistics; pitching statistics

Individual single-season recordsBatting statistics; pitching statistics

Team single-game records
Source:

Team season records
Batting statistics; pitching statistics

See also
Baseball statistics
Miami Marlins award winners and league leaders

References

External links

Records
Miami Marlins